Musician of the Year is an album led by jazz trombonist Eddie Bert recorded in 1955 and first released on the Savoy label.

Reception

The Allmusic review by Ken Dryden stated: "While the original album title may be a sign of the record label getting carried away, trombonist Eddie Bert is a strong bebop trombonist like J.J. Johnson. On this session he's joined by the always superb pianist Hank Jones, plus Wendell Marshall and Kenny Clarke. ... Bert's been more active as a sideman than a leader since the '50s, so this is one album that his fans need to acquire".

Track listing
All compositions by Eddie Bert, except where indicated.
 "Fragile" (Ernie Wilkins) – 5:25
 "Stompin' at the Savoy" (Edgar Sampson, Benny Goodman, Andy Razaf, Chick Webb) – 3:19
 "I Should'a Said" – 4:32
 "See You Later" – 5:02
 "Three Bass Hit" (Ozzie Cadena) – 7:36
 "What D'Ya Say?" (Cadena) – 5:45
 "Billie's Bounce" (Charlie Parker) – 3:37

Personnel
Eddie Bert – trombone 
Hank Jones – piano
Wendell Marshall – bass 
Kenny Clarke – drums

References

Savoy Records albums
Eddie Bert albums
1955 albums
Albums produced by Ozzie Cadena
Albums recorded at Van Gelder Studio